Dolichoderus siggii is a species of ant in the genus Dolichoderus. Described by Forel in 1895, the species is endemic to Thailand.

References

Dolichoderus
Hymenoptera of Asia
Insects of Thailand
Insects described in 1895